There have been some discoveries of unusually well-preserved fossil dinosaur specimens which bear remnants of tissues and bodily structures.  All organic tissue usually decays too quickly to enter the fossil record, unlike more mineralised bones and teeth.

Ornithischians

Basal ornithischians

Hadrosaurs

Ceratopsians

Thyreophorans

Saurischians

Maniraptoriformes

Compsognathidae

Tyrannosauroidea

Abelisaurs

Sauropodomorphs

See also
Dinosaur coloration
Feathered dinosaur

References 

Preserved soft tissue
Dinosaur-related lists